Cat Cay Airport  is a private airport located on North Cat Cay, the Bahamas. The airport is for the exclusive use of the Cat Cay Yacht Club and requires you to either be a member, or be sponsored by a member to land. The airport is served by Tropic Ocean Airways on a charter basis or by Fly the Whale in the winter, also on a charter basis.

See also
List of airports in the Bahamas
List of shortest runways

References

External links 
 Airport record for Cat Cay Airport at Landings.com
 Fly The Whale Charter Flights into Cat Cay
 Tropic Ocean Airways Charter Flights into Cat Cay

Airports in the Bahamas